Milan "Mile" Spasovski (born March 24, 1951) is a Yugoslav retired slalom canoeist who competed from the late 1960s to the mid-1970s. He finished ninth in the K-1 event at the 1972 Summer Olympics in Munich.

References
Sports-reference.com profile

1951 births
Canoeists at the 1972 Summer Olympics
Living people
Olympic canoeists of Yugoslavia
Yugoslav male canoeists
Place of birth missing (living people)